Pinar del Rey may refer to:

 Pinar del Rey (Madrid), a ward (barrio) of Madrid, Spain
 Pinar del Rey (Madrid Metro), a railway station
 Pinar del Rey (park), in San Roque, Cádiz, Spain